Otto Pfister is a German football manager.

Otto Pfister may also refer to:

 Otto Pfister (naturalist), Swiss nature photographer
 Otto Pfister (gymnast), Swiss gymnast
 Otto Pfister (architect), Swiss architect